Ryu Cha-dal (류차달) is the founder of the Korean Munhwa Ryu clan. He was born in 28 August, 880AD by the lunar calendar and was named the lord (호족) of Munwha as well as given the title De-seung-gong (대승공) and his sur name by King Taejo Wangon of the Goryeo dynasty (고려왕조) for his help in unifying the Korean Peninsula. His tomb is reportedly still being preserved in North Korea. The clan he founded is thriving to this day.

Ryu Cha-dal only had one son who was called Ryu Hyo-geum (류효금) and one grandson who was called Ryu Geum-Whan (류금환).There are some stories that tell he was one of or a son of one of the people moving into Koryo after the fall of the kingdom of Balhae (another Korean kingdom) in the north to Khitan (거란) invaders from the Kingdom of Liao (요). Others say he was a descendant of a noble of Shilla (신라) who ran away after a failed rebellion.

10th-century Korean people
Year of birth missing
Year of death missing